Tina Lyman Kellogg (born June 15, 1949) is an American former professional tennis player.

A left-hander from Los Altos, California, Lyman started aged 12 and was nationally ranked in junior tennis. She made the singles third round of the 1967 U.S. National Championships, losing to unseeded player Maryna Godwin.

In 1972 she was married to UC Berkeley graduate Don Kellogg.

References

External links
 

1962 births
Living people
American female tennis players
Tennis people from California
Sportspeople from Santa Clara County, California
People from Los Altos, California